Clarence Strait is a strait in southeastern Alaska.

Clarence Strait may also refer to:
Clarence Strait (Northern Territory), Australia
Clarence Strait (Iran)
Clarence Streit, American journalist who played a prominent role in the Atlanticist and world federalist movements.